Namakkal taluk is a taluk of Namakkal district of the Indian state of Tamil Nadu. The headquarters of the taluk is the town of Namakkal

Demographics
According to the 2011 census, the taluk of Namakkal had a population of 540,148 with 272,175  males and 267,973 females. There were 985 women for every 1,000 men. The taluk had a literacy rate of 70.32%. Child population in the age group below 6 was 24,026 Males and 21,648 Females.

References 

Taluks of Namakkal district